Kasper Torsting (born September 22, 1975) is a Danish film director, producer, screenwriter, cinematographer, and editor. He is best known for his early works as a cinematographer and director on the documentaries Rocket Brothers,  and the cinema-portrait of fellow Danish director, Oscar winner Thomas Vinterberg and David Bowie.

Early life 
Torsting was born in Viborg, Denmark on September 22, 1975.

Career 
He is trained as a director from the Danish Film School's documentary line (1997–2001), and has since worked on a large number of documentaries, which have had Danish and international premieres, as well as music videos, short films and feature films. Kasper Torsting is co-founder of Oure Dox and has taught at the Oure School.

Kasper Torsting made his debut as a feature film director with the “A War Within” in 2018. The film won the ‘Nordic Competition’ and the ‘Audience Award’ at the 34th Santa Barbara International Film Festival, as well as several more honors. Kasper Torsting has directed several major commercials from 2013, alongside his work on documentaries and films.
 
In 2016 Kasper Torsting produced, with Studio+, a web based mini-tv-series “Ø”, which is a thriller made for cellphone screens.

Filmography 
 Den anden side (Documentary) (2001)
Mr. Vinterberg & Mr. Bowie  (Documentary) (2002)
Rocket Brothers - tæt på bandet Kashmir (Documentary) (2003)
The Aftermath (Documentary) (2005)
 (Documentary) (2007)
Vores Krig (Documentary) (2009)
Krigsminister (Documentary) (2009)
Søren Gade, de sidste 48 timer Documentary) (2009)
Udflugt (Short film, Fiction) (2010)
Armadillo (Documentary, idea and producer) (2011)
Sex, kaos og bekendelser  (TV-series, editor) (2012)
Piratjagt  (2012)
Ø  (Web TV-series) (2016)
A War Within (2017)

Awards and honors 
 2017 – Jury Award -Best Script for Ø - Shared with Amulya Malladi (writer) - LA Web Fest
2018 – Valhalla Award for A War Within- Santa Barbara International Film Festival
2018 – Audience Choice Award - Best Feature Length Film for A War Within  - Santa Barbara International Film Festival
2019 – Jury Award - Best International Narrative Feature for A War Within - Shared with Ronnie Fridthjof (writer) - Rome International Film Festival
 2019 – Audience Award - Best Feature for A War Within - Shared with Ronnie Fridthjof (writer) - Rome International Film Festival 
 2019 – Jury Award - Best Film for A War Within - Shared with Ronnie Fridthjof (writer)- Fairhope Film Festival 2019 – Audience Award - Best Feature for A War Within’' - Shared with Ronnie Fridthjof (writer) - Lighthouse International Film Festival Danish awards and honors 

 2004 – CPH:DOX Award - Gold Dok Best Sound]] for Rocket Brothers - tæt på bandet Kashmir - CPH:DOX
2004 – Nordic Documentary Film Award - Best Nordic Documentary for Rocket Brothers - tæt på bandet Kashmir - Nordisk Panorama
2004 – Jury Special Prize for Rocket Brothers - tæt på bandet Kashmir - Odense International Film Festival
2007 – Youth Jury Prize, special mention for Solo - Odense International Film Festival
2007 – Audience Award for Solo - Odense International Film Festival
2008 – TV Prisen - Best Documentary Series, for Politiskolen2010 – Robert for Best Documentary (Årets lange dokumentarfilm) for Armadillo.
2010 – Bodil for Best Documentary (Bedste dokumentarfilm) for Armadillo2012 – TV Prisen - Best Documentary Series, for Sex, kaos og bekendelser''

References

External links 

 Kasper Torstings homepage

Film directors from Copenhagen
Danish documentary film directors
1975 births
Living people